Henry Scott Stewart was an American football coach, lawyer, and businessman. He served as the head football coach at Kenyon College from 1895 to 1896 and Western Reserve University in 1897, compiling a career college football coaching record of 6–11–2.

Stewart attended Cleveland's Central High School, where we was star player on the 1890 team.

Stewart played his college football at Western Reserve from 1891 to 1894, where he served as team captain of the undefeated 1894 team, coached by Charles O. Jenkins.  The team went 7–0, outscoring opponents by a combined 232–8.

Head coaching record

References

Year of birth missing
Year of death missing
19th-century players of American football
American football tackles
American lawyers
Case Western Spartans football coaches
Case Western Spartans football players
Kenyon Lords football coaches
Sportspeople from Cleveland
Players of American football from Cleveland